Aleksandr Kholodinsky (born 16 October 1991) is a Belarusian professional footballer.

References

External links
 
 

1991 births
Living people
Belarusian footballers
Association football midfielders
FC Gorodeya players
FC Isloch Minsk Raion players
FC Chist players
FC Sputnik Rechitsa players
FC Shakhtyor Petrikov players
FC Molodechno players